The Cape silverside (Atherina breviceps) is a species of marine fish of the family Atherinidae. It is a brackish, freshwater, pelagic-neritic subtropical fish up to 11.0 cm maximal length. It is widespread in the southeastern Atlantic from Lüderitz in Namibia to northern Natal in South Africa.

References 
 

Atherina
Fish of the Atlantic Ocean
Fish of the Indian Ocean
Fish described in 1835
Taxa named by Achille Valenciennes